Clearcreek Township is one of the thirteen townships of Fairfield County, Ohio, United States. As of the 2010 census the population was 4,057, up from 3,411 at the 2000 census. 3,497 people lived in the unincorporated portions of the township in 2010.

Geography
Located in the southwestern corner of the county, it borders the following townships:
Amanda Township - north
Hocking Township - northeast corner
Madison Township - east
Perry Township, Hocking County - southeast
Salt Creek Township, Pickaway County - south
Pickaway Township, Pickaway County - southwest corner
Washington Township, Pickaway County - west

The village of Stoutsville is located in western Clearcreek Township.

Name and history
Statewide, the only other Clearcreek Township is located in Warren County.

Government
The township is governed by a three-member board of trustees, who are elected in November of odd-numbered years to a four-year term beginning on the following January 1. Two are elected in the year after the presidential election and one is elected in the year before it. There is also an elected township fiscal officer, who serves a four-year term beginning on April 1 of the year after the election, which is held in November of the year before the presidential election. Vacancies in the fiscal officership or on the board of trustees are filled by the remaining trustees.

References

External links
County website

Townships in Fairfield County, Ohio
Townships in Ohio